Arlington to Boston is the third album released from the band emmet swimming. It was the release that first garnered national attention for them.

Track listing

Awards

Personnel
Todd Watts - Vocals, Guitar
Erik Wenberg	- Guitar, backing vocals
Luke Michel - Bass
Tamer Eid - Drums
Don Dixon	- Producer
Don Dixon and Mark Williams - Engineer

References

Emmet Swimming albums
1996 albums